Neoscaptia albicollis is a moth of the family Erebidae. It was described by Walter Rothschild in 1912. It is found in Papua New Guinea.

Subspecies
Neoscaptia albicollis albicollis
Neoscaptia albicollis reducta (Rothschild, 1936) (New Ireland)

References

Moths described in 1912
Lithosiini